Minimasgali as a place name may refer to:
 Minimasgali (Dhaalu Atoll) (Republic of Maldives)
 Minimasgali (Faafu Atoll) (Republic of Maldives)